Samaresh Routray (born 3 July 1980) is a film actor, producer and television personality from Odisha. He is mostly known for the negative roles. He has been awarded as Best Actor In Negative Role many times, including 2 Tarang Cine Awards. He was awarded as Best Actor for NAMARD in 28th Odisha State Film Awards.

Early life 
Routray was born in Bhubaneswar, Odisha to Alekha Prasad Routray and Laxmipriya Routray. He is an alumnus of National School of Drama. He has done MBA in HR and Marketing.

Filmography 
Routray started his career with a Hindi feature film 23rd March 1931: Shaheed in 2002 where he played the role of Yaspal. After a gap of 4 years he made his debut in Odia film industry with Mo Suna Pua in 2006. Then he did Dhauli Express as a lead, which got the best film award in Odisha State Film Awards.

During the initial days, he worked in the small screen with popular Odia television serials like Uttardayee, Sanskaar, Khara Barsara Khela, Basundhara, and Debi.

In Mukhyamantri, he did an ambitious leader's role and with this film he started portraying villainous roles, which continued in Loafer (2011), Most Wanted, Luchakali (2012) and so on.

Routray has established a music company named Odiaone Entertatinment and a film production house named S3 Movies. He became producer with the Luchakali film in 2012.

Filmography (Odia)

Filmography (Hindi) 
 23rd March 1931: Shaheed (2002)

Television

Acting Theater 
Routray's theater journey comprised some plays such as the following.

Awards 
2017
 28th Odisha State Film Awards - Best Actor In  NAMARD Movie.
2016
7th Tarang Cine Awards - Best Actor In Negative Role "Ishq Tu Hi Tu" Movie.
 Odisha State Film Awards - Best Actor in supporting Role "Ishq Tu Hi Tu" Movie.

2011 - 2012
 3rd Tarang Cine Awards - Best Actor in A Negative Role "Loafer" Movie
 Instant News Entertainment-  for Most Wanted Movie
 6th Showtime Award - for Most Wanted
 LALCHAND ENTERTAINMENT AWARD- Favourite Actor in Negative Role
 CHALACHITRA JAGAT- for Best actor in Negative role Most Wanted Movie.

2009 - 2010
 4th Showtime Oriya Film & TV awards - Best Actor in a Negative role for Sanskaar.
 2nd Vysya Oriya Film & TV awards - Best Actor in a Negative role for Sanskaar.
 Gurukul Awards – Best Actor in a Negative role for Sanskaar.
 
2008 - 2009
 Amit Awards - Best Actor in a Negative role for Sanskar.
 AB Visual TV Awards - Best Actor in a Supporting Role for Uttardai.

2007 - 2008
 Banichitra Award - Special Award for contribution to Oriya television & film Industry

References

External links 

 

Male actors in Odia cinema
Living people
Male actors in Hindi cinema
21st-century Indian male actors
1980 births